Shadow Parties is a 2021 Nigerian political drama film directed and produced by Yemi Amodu. The film stars Yemi Blaq, Omotola Jalade-Ekeinde, Toyin Abraham, Jide Kosoko, Sola Sobowale, Magdalena Korpas, and Lucien Morgan. It premiered on Netflix on 6 September 2021.

Plot  
The theme of the film revolves around a communal clash in which Aremu from Aje, a town that neighbours Iludun, where his wife, Arike was born, well known for fratricidal wars, which had claimed the lives of Arike's parents. The two towns were thrown into war after the kinsmen of Aremu decided to burn his wife and child alive claiming she was an enemy which then triggered reprisal attacks from the Iluduns led by Lowo, Arike's brother.

Cast 

 Toyin Abraham as Arike
 Toyin Adegbola as Queen of Aje Land
 Yemi Blaq as Owuteru
 Omotola Jalade-Ekeinde as Princess Fadekemi
 Romoke Ajayi as Queen of Iludun Land
 Segun Arinze as Chief Obanla
 Saheed Balogun as Akuwe
 Jibola Dabo as King of Aje Land
 Ken Erics as Aremu
 Gbemisola Faleti as Akanji
 Chris Iheuwa as Ben Akuga 
 Magdalena Korpas as Atilola's Wife
 Jide Kosoko as Chief Atilola
 Sola Kosoko as Asabi
 Lola Lawal as Nurse
 Rotimi Makinde as King of Iludun Land
 Lucien Morgan as Ian
 Tunde Oladimeji as Ayinla
 Hafiz Oyetoro as Bogumbe
 Rotimi Salami as Akinola
 Jimi Sholanke as Akanji's Father
 Sola Sobowale as Amoke
 Bode Sowande as Professor

Awards and nominations

References

External links 

 
 

2021 films
2021 drama films
Nigerian drama films
Films shot in Nigeria
English-language Nigerian films